Pomaderris eriocephala is a species of flowering plant in the family Rhamnaceae and is endemic to south-eastern continental Australia. It is a spreading shrub with hairy stems, egg-shaped leaves, and clusters of cream-coloured flowers with white to rust-coloured hairs.

Description
Flowering occurs in September and October.

Taxonomy
Pomaderris eriocephala was first formally described in 1951 by Norman Arthur Wakefield in The Victorian Naturalist from specimens he collected near the Upper Genoa River in 1949. The specific epithet (eriocephala) means "wool-headed".

Distribution and habitat
This pomaderris grows in forest and woodland, and is found from south of Barrington Tops along the coast, tablelands and western slopes of New South Wales, through the Australian Capital Territory to Bairnsdale in eastern Victoria.

References

Flora of New South Wales
Flora of Victoria (Australia)
Flora of the Australian Capital Territory
eriocephala
Taxa named by Norman Arthur Wakefield
Plants described in 1951